Istanbul's first electoral district is one of three divisions of the Istanbul electoral district for the purpose of elections to Grand National Assembly of Turkey.  It elects thirty-five members of parliament (deputies) to represent the district for a five-year term by the D'Hondt method, a party-list proportional representation system.

The district covers the entire Anatolian side of the Istanbul Province, on the east of the Bosphorus.

Division
The first electoral district contains the following Istanbul administrative districts (ilçe):

Adalar
Ataşehir
Beykoz
Çekmeköy
Kadıköy
Kartal
Maltepe
Pendik
Sancaktepe
Sultanbeyli
Şile
Tuzla
Ümraniye
Üsküdar

Members 
Population reviews of each electoral district are conducted before each general election, which can lead to certain districts being granted a smaller or greater number of parliamentary seats. İstanbul (I) gained 6 extra seats for the 2011 general election, thus electing 30 seats as opposed to 24 that it elected in 1999, 2002 and 2007.

General elections

2011

References 

Electoral districts of Turkey